Tawhidul Islam (born 17 November 1992) is a Bangladeshi first-class cricketer who plays for Barisal Division.

See also
 List of Barisal Division cricketers

References

External links
 

1992 births
Living people
Bangladeshi cricketers
Barisal Division cricketers